Louis Hofmann (born 3 June 1997) is a German actor. He first gained attention as the lead in the 2011 German film  and won the Bodil Award for Best Supporting Actor for his role as a teenage German prisoner of war in the 2015 Danish film Land of Mine. He is also known for playing Jonas in the 2017 German Netflix Original series Dark.

Life and career
Hofmann was born in the Bensberg district of Bergisch Gladbach and grew up in Cologne. His first experience in front of the camera was for Servicezeit, an evening magazine programme on WDR Fernsehen television network. He appeared in a section of the programme, Die Ausflieger, which tested family recreational activities. After two and a half years at Servicezeit, he decided to become an actor and applied to an acting agency. He was subsequently represented by Agentur Schwarz.

In 2009 Hofmann guest-starred in legal comedy-drama Danni Lowinski and television series Der verlorene Vater. He also appeared in the television film Tod in Istanbul. In 2010 he performed in Wilsberg and Alarm for Cobra 11.

Hofmann's first cinematic leading role was the titular Tom Sawyer in director Hermine Huntgeburth's 2011 German film adaptation of the classic Mark Twain novel The Adventures of Tom Sawyer. Along with Leon Seidel, who played the role of Huck Finn, he sang on the soundtrack of the film in the song, "Barfuß Gehen" ("Going Barefoot"). The sequel to Tom Sawyer,  (German: Die Abenteuer des Huck Finn), was released on 20 December 2012 in German cinemas. In 2013, Hofmann played a guest-starring role in an episode of the television series Stolberg. Beginning on 24 October 2013 Hofmann appeared in the comedy The Nearly Perfect Man (German: Der fast perfekte Mann).

His role as Wolfgang in the 2015 film Sanctuary (German: Freistatt) directed by Marc Brummund earned him the 2015 Bavarian Film Prize as Best Newcomer Actor and the 2016 German Actors Award (Deutscher Schauspielerpreis) in the newcomer category. His first international role as a German prisoner of war in the Danish-German co-production Land of Mine (Danish: Under sandet) earned him the Best Supporting Actor prize at Denmark's Bodil Awards in 2016. At the 2016 German Film Awards, he received with the Special Prize Jaeger-LeCoultre Homage to German Cinema presented to honour the work of German actors in international films.

In 2016 Hofmann played Phil in Center of My World (German: Die Mitte der Welt), a coming-of-age romantic drama film directed by Jakob M. Erwa, based on the 1998 bestselling novel The Center of the World by Andreas Steinhöfel. He was presented with a European Shooting Stars Award at Berlinale 2017 by the European Film Promotion organisation.

In 2016, Hofmann was cast as Jonas Kahnwald in Dark, a science fiction thriller released on Netflix on 1 December 2017. His character is one of the leads and is the main love interest for the character of Martha Nielsen. A second season was released on 21 June 2019. A third and final season was released on 27 June 2020.

Selected filmography

Television

Film

Radio

Awards and nominations

References

External links
 
 

1997 births
German male child actors
Living people
German male film actors
German male television actors